The Santa Ana Zoo at Prentice Park in Santa Ana, California, is a  zoo focusing on the animals and plants of Central and South America. The Santa Ana Zoo hosts more than 270,000 people annually. The zoo opened in 1952 and is owned and operated by the City of Santa Ana. Joseph Prentice donated land for the zoo with the stipulation that the city must keep at least 50 monkeys at all times. The zoo maintains an extensive primate collection with over a dozen species from around the world.

The focus of the Santa Ana Zoo is recreation, education, and conservation. It was previously accredited by the Association of Zoos and Aquariums (AZA).

History
Joseph Edward Prentice bought the  site. He donated  to the city of Santa Ana in 1949 and stipulated that the zoo have at least fifty monkeys at all times. Construction of the zoo began that year, and it opened on March 8, 1952. A children's zoo was soon built and the Flight Aviary, now known as the Jack Lynch Aviary, was completed in 1962. In 1983, the amphitheater was completed and the zoo gained AZA accreditation. The 1990s had three major events: in 1990, the Flight Aviary was upgraded and renamed the Jack Lynch Aviary; Amazon's Edge opened in 1992; and Colors of the Amazon Aviary opened in 1996. In the 2000s, the Zoofari Express Train Ride opened in 2000, Crean Family Farm opened in 2004, and Tierra de las Pampas opened in 2010. With its outdated monkey habitats, the Association of Zoos and Aquariums declined to accredit the zoo in 2017.

Exhibits

Tierra De Las Pampas
In April 2010, Santa Ana Zoo opened a new exhibit, Tierra de las Pampas or "Land of the Grasses." It is the first in a series of new exhibits. Covering , Tierra de las Pampas houses giant anteaters in one exhibit, and greater rheas and guanacos in the larger one, with a footpath between them.

Rainforest Exhibit 
The Rainforest Exhibit is a small exhibit that represents the Amazon, home to white-faced saki monkeys and green iguanas.

Amazon's Edge
This exhibit, opened on September 1, 1993, replicates a section of the Brazilian rainforest. The exhibit consists of a water moat and a forested riverbank set against a cliff face, with a wooden deck for visitors to see the animals. The species on exhibit include howler monkeys, black-necked swans and crested screamers.

Colors of the Amazon Aviary
The  Colors of the Amazon Aviary opened on August 1, 1996. This walk-through aviary displays a variety of South American birds in a lushly planted habitat with meandering streams.

Crean Family Farm
Crean Family Farm opened in July 2004 and focuses on rare breeds of domestic and farm animals. The centerpiece of the complex is a two-story red barn which houses pigs and an education space.

Ocelot Habitat and Education Center 
Ocelot Habitat is home to a breeding pair of Brazilian Ocelots located in 2 linked habitats. Interactive picnic tables let guests discover the special adaptations unique to ocelots.

List of animals

Species formerly kept

Primates 

Black lemur,
Greater bushbaby,
Golden-bellied mangabey,
Lion tailed macaque,
Celebes crested macaque,
Lesser spot-nosed guenon,
Stump-tailed macaque,
Rhesus macaque

Other Mammals 

Günther's dik-dik,
Sika deer,
Mule deer,
Collared peccary,
Rock hyrax,
Cat,
Oncilla,
Mountain lion,
Serval,
Tayra,
Swamp wallaby

Birds 

Ocellated turkey,
Channel-billed toucan,
Chestnut-mandibled toucan,
Burrowing owl,
Red junglefowl,
Emu,
Magpie goose

Other attractions

One of the most popular attractions at the Santa Ana Zoo is the Zoofari Express children's train. There are two engines: 1030 and 1036. Both are 14 gauge, 4-4-4 configuration locomotives.

The original 1030 engine was constructed in 1954 by the Hurlbut Amusement Company of Buena Park. Engine 1030 was originally installed at Santa's Village in Sky Forest, California. It operated there continuously for 44 years. The train was then restored by volunteers from Mater Dei High School with the help of Bud Hurlbut. The restored train opened at the Santa Ana Zoo in the spring of 1999. Engine 1030 was gas-powered, but in 2006 it was converted to electric power.

Engine 1036 is a new electric-powered locomotive that was installed in 2005, along with new passenger cars.

The zoo also features a Conservation Carousel with a 33 animal line-up including the giraffe, giant panda, African elephant, cheetah, hummingbird, gorilla, bald eagle, jaguar, zebra, Bengal tiger, otter, panther, seal, sea dragon and a custom-made anteater. The carousel also features a wheelchair-accessible Studded Leather Swan Chariot.

Incidents
In July 2018, Aquinas Kasbar broke into the enclosure for lemurs and capuchin monkeys and stole Isaac, the oldest living ring-tailed lemur in captivity at the time, to keep as a pet. He left the animal, unharmed,  outside a Newport Beach hotel the next day with notes identifying him & instructing he be returned to the zoo. In July 2019 Kasbar pleaded guilty in federal court to unlawfully taking an endangered species and U.S. District Judge Andrew Guilford sentenced him to three months in prison, run concurrently with a state sentence for a series of residential burglaries.

Visitor information
The Santa Ana Zoo is located at 1801 East Chestnut Avenue in Santa Ana, California.

The zoo is open daily, except for Christmas Day, New Year's Day and Thanksgiving Day . The hours of operation are 10:00 am to 4:00 pm daily but guests may remain in the zoo until 5:00 pm year round.

See also
 Orange County Zoo, Orange, California

References

External links

Zoos in California
Tourist attractions in Orange County, California
Buildings and structures in Santa Ana, California
Culture of Santa Ana, California
Organizations based in Santa Ana, California
Parks in Orange County, California
Zoos established in 1952